John Cross (born 15 March 1972) is an Australian former rugby league footballer and Port Kembla Blacks junior.

Cross was a back rower who played for the Illawarra Steelers, Penrith Panthers and the St. George Illawarra Dragons

Cross is the son of former St George Player Greg Cross.

An Illawarra junior, Cross was given the honour of captaining the Illawarra side at the age of just twenty against the touring Great Britain team in 1992. He went on to captain the Illawarra Steelers in first grade.

References

Sources

External links
John Cross at yesterdayshero.com.au

1972 births
Living people
Australian rugby league players
Illawarra Steelers players
Penrith Panthers players
Penrith Panthers captains
Country New South Wales Origin rugby league team players
St. George Illawarra Dragons players
Rugby league locks